"El Rey" (in English: "The King") is a 1971 song by Mexican singer and songwriter José Alfredo Jiménez. It is one of his best known songs and a Latin Grammy Hall of Fame recipient. The song is about a macho guy convinced his rough-and-tumble life doesn't prevent him from remaining the king among his peers.

A chart published by Record World credited "El Rey" as reaching number one in Mexico in 1974, a year after Jiménez's death.

"El Rey" remains a staple of Ranchera and traditional Mexican music. The song has been covered by various artist, which includes Vicente Fernández version, which could perhaps be the best-known version of the song.

Other versions 

The song has been covered by various artists the following are notable other versions.

Vicente Fernández version 
The perhaps best-known version of the song is by singer-songwriter and actor Vicente Fernández whose version peaked at number 40 on the US Billboard Hot Latin Songs chart in 1973.

Christina Aguilera version 
In 2022, American singer Christina Aguilera released "La Reina" from her ninth studio and second Spanish-language album, Aguilera (2022) as a "respectful response" to Fernández' version of "El Rey". In her version, Aguilera emphasizes how a king will always be a king, but that he's nothing without his queen. Aguilera's rendition received acclaim.

References

1971 songs
Latin Grammy Hall of Fame Award recipients
Vicente Fernández songs
Los Super Reyes songs
Songs written by José Alfredo Jiménez
Song recordings produced by Cruz Martínez
RCA Victor singles